Lawrence S. Ely (July 4, 1911 – November 3, 1983) was an American football player.  He was born in Wisconsin and raised in Nelson and Grand Island, Nebraska.   He played college football at the center position for the Nebraska Cornhuskers football team and was selected by the Associated Press, Collier's Weekly (chosen by Grantland Rice), and the All-America Board, as a first-team player on the 1932 College Football All-America Team. He was inducted into the Nebraska Football Hall of Fame in 1974.

References 

1911 births
1983 deaths
American football centers
Nebraska Cornhuskers football players
Players of American football from Wisconsin
People from Nuckolls County, Nebraska
People from Grand Island, Nebraska